Conrad I of Sanneck (? – before 1255), Lord of Žovnek (Sanneck, in German), was a free noble in the March of Savinja in the Holy Roman Empire, in what is now Slovenia. He was an ancestor of the House of Celje, founded by his grandson Frederick.

He was born to the free noble (roughly equivalent to a baron) Gebhard II of Sanneck. Little is known of his youth. He flourished between 1220 and 1241, when his name is present in various sources, showing that he was the owner of large allods in the Savinja Valley, then part of the March of Carniola. In 1237, the Patriarch of Aquileia Berthold of Andechs-Merania invested him with several fiefs in Carniola and in the Windic March. Sources show that Conrad had a relatively large number of vassals, among whom the Auersperg family.

It was Conrad who first used the traditional coat-of-arms of the House of Sanneck, two red stripes on a silver shield.

Conrad was mentioned by the minnesanger Ulrich von Liechtenstein in his Frauendienst as a participant of the tournament in Friesach in Carinthia. Conrad very likely wrote poetry himself, being considered the same person as "the Knight from Sanneck" mentioned in the famous Liederhandschrift (book of poetry), known as the Codex Manesse.

Family 

Conrad married the noblewoman Sophie of Pfannberg-Peggau. They had six children:

Conrad II of Sanneck
Liutpold III of Sanneck 
Gebhard III of Sanneck
Ulrich of Sanneck, who eventually became his father's sole heir
Sophia
Gertrud

References

1255 deaths
Counts of Celje